The 2167/2168 Changchun-Mudanjiang Through Train (Chinese:2167/2168次长春到牡丹江普通快速列车) is a passenger train running from Changchun to Mudanjiang. It carries express passenger trains for the Shenyang Railway Bureau, the Changchun segment is responsible for passenger transport. Changchun originates on the Mudanjiang train. 25B type passenger trains run along the Changtu Railway and Tujia Railway across Heilongjiang, Jilin and other areas. The 777 km Changchun Railway Station to Mudanjiang Railway Station route runs 15 hours and 23 minutes. From Mudanjiang Railway Station to Changchun Railway Station runs 14 hours and 54 minutes.

Carriages

Locomotives

References 

Passenger rail transport in China
Rail transport in Jilin
Rail transport in Heilongjiang